Francis Conrad Osborn Sr. (December 10, 1856 – May 25, 1927) was a teacher, businessman and inventor. He held about 50 patents for cash register designs, springless scales, and other devices.

Early life and education
Son of Ozias and Mary C. (Herbener) Osborn, he was born and raised in Bridgeport, New York. He was educated in local schools and Cazenovia Seminary. Osborn taught in public schools of Fayetteville, New York in 1880-1882 before enrolling at Syracuse University, where he graduated with honors in 1885. He was a member of Delta Upsilon fraternity.

Career
After working for several years for Ginn & Co., he settled in Detroit, Michigan in 1889 to work on a design for a cash register. In 1891 he married Laura A. Freele. They had three children.

Osborn organized several companies in Detroit, including: the Osborn Cash Register Co., Ltd. in 1896, which he sold out to the National Cash Register Co. in 1900; the Standard Computing Scale Co., Ltd. in 1889, which produced devices he designed; the Perfection Hand Stamp Company in 1900, which produced cancellation devices used in post offices in the US and Canada; and the F.C. Osborn Co., which produced machinery for making cardboard tubing and scales.

Some patents applied for and issued
All patents in the United States, except where noted:
Cash register and indicator; Patent no.: 455111; Filing date: Dec. 6, 1889; Issue date: Jun. 30, 1891
Power transmitter; Patent no.: 472222; Filing date: Nov. 14, 1891; Issue date: Apr. 5, 1892
Power transmitter; Patent no.: 472223; Filing date: Nov. 14, 1891; Issue date: Apr. 5, 1892
Calculating machine; Patent no.: 484814; Filing date: Jun. 18, 1891; Issue date: Oct. 25, 1892
Cash register; Patent no.: 491022; Filing date: Jun. 11, 1891; Issue date: Jan. 31, 1893
Cash register; Patent no.: 615409; Filing date: Aug. 13, 1897; Issue date: Dec. 6, 1898
Letter-canceling machine; Patent no.: 645711; Filing date: Feb. 5, 1900; Issue date: Mar. 20, 1900
Letter mail cancelling machine; Canada Patent #67,988; Filing date: 1 March 1900; Issue date: 5 July 1900
Double saw for cutting button blanks; Patent no.: 650189; Filing date: Jun. 29, 1895; Issue date: May 22, 1900
Computing scale; Patent no.: 698048; Filing date: Dec. 17, 1900; Issue date: Apr. 22, 1902
Platform support for scales; Patent no.: 710003; Filing date: Dec. 17, 1900; Issue date: Sep. 30, 1902
Tube-making machine; Patent no.: 710507; Filing date: Mar. 10, 1902; Issue date: Oct. 7, 1902
Tube-making machine; Patent no.: 712954; Filing date: May 24, 1902; Issue date: Nov. 4, 1902
Cash register ; Patent no.: 715850; Filing date: Jan. 31, 1899; Issue date: Dec. 16, 1902
Cash register; Patent no.: 723906; Filing date: May 27, 1899; Issue date: Mar. 31, 1903
Air brake (with W.J Vaughn & E.C. van Husan) Patent no.: 755335; Filing date: Apr. 27, 1903; Issue date: Mar. 22, 1904
Electric recorder; Patent no.: 767525; Filing date: Aug. 3, 1903; Issue date: Aug. 16, 1904
Cash register; Patent no.: 773096; Filing date: Nov. 18, 1898; Issue date: Oct. 25, 1904
Cash register; Patent no.: 786377; Filing date: Aug. 24, 1895; Issue date: Apr. 4, 1905
Time clock for cash registers; Patent no.: 790654; Filing date: Aug. 20, 1900; Issue date: May 23, 1905
Computing scale; Patent no.: 793606; Filing date: Jan. 19, 1905; Issue date: Jun. 27, 1905
Crank-shaft; Patent no.: 805878; Filing date: Aug. 25, 1903; Issue date: Nov. 28, 1905
Weighing scale; Patent no.: 806908; Filing date: Sep. 29, 1900; Issue date: Dec. 12, 1905
Cash register; Patent no.: 817725; Filing date: Nov. 23, 1891; Issue date: Apr. 10, 1906
Cash register; Patent no.: 824881; Filing date: Sep. 11, 1899; Issue date: Jul. 3, 1906
Check printing cash register; Patent no.: 831626; Filing date: Oct. 22, 1901; Issue date: Sep. 25, 1906
Check or ticket printing machine; Patent no.: 832271; Filing date: Nov. 8, 1901; Issue date: Oct. 2, 1906
Cash register; Patent no.: 861312; Filing date: Oct. 23, 1901(?); Issue date: Jul. 30, 1907
Cut-off mechanism for paper-tube machines; Patent no.: 863208; Filing date: Jul. 31, 1905; Issue date: Aug. 13, 1907
Change making, indicating, and registering machine; Patent no.: 864185; Filing date: Dec. 10, 1891; Issue date: Aug. 27, 1907
Cheese cutter; Patent no.: 879407; Filing date: Dec. 15, 1904; Issue date: Feb. 18, 1908
Automatic weighing scale; Patent no.: 888646; Filing date: Jan. 21, 1907; Issue date: May 26, 1908
Cash register; Patent no.: 926072; Filing date: Apr. 26, 1896?; Issue date: Jun. 22, 1909
Paper tube machine; Patent no.: 945862; Filing date: Mar. 26, 1904; Issue date: Jan. 11, 1910
Cash indicator and register; Patent no.: 982853; Filing date: May 2, 1896; Issue date: Jan. 31, 1911
Container body forming machine; Patent no.: 996122; Filing date: Jan. 20, 1908; Issue date: Jun. 27, 1911
Severing mechanisms for tube-making machines; Patent no.: 1006399; Filing date: Jun. 28, 1909; Issue date: Oct. 17, 1911
Machine for making spirally wound tubes ; Patent no.: 1006976; Filing date: Jun. 28, 1909; Issue date: Oct. 24, 1911
Glue-applying machine for use in making spirally-wound tubes; Patent no.: 1018335; Filing date: Dec. 24, 1909; Issue date: Feb. 20, 1912
Computing scale; Patent no.: 1062603; Filing date: Jul. 22, 1908; Issue date: May 27, 1913
Puzzle; Patent no.: 1092165; Filing date: Jun. 25, 1910; Issue date: Apr. 7, 1914
Cash register; Patent no.: 1119983; Filing date: Jan 23, 1895; Issue date: Dec 8, 1914
Soap powder dispenser; Patent no.: 1226803; Filing date: Mar. 1, 1912; Issue date: May 3, 1917
Scale; Patent no.: 1289885; Filing date: Feb. 17, 1913; Issue date: Dec. 31, 1918
Container spout; Patent no.: 1375725; Filing date: Jun. 17, 1916; Issue date: Apr. 26, 1921

References

General sources
"Bio. of Frank Conrad Osborn," The Book of Detroiters, Albert N. Marquis, ed., Chicago, A.N. Marquis & Co., 1908. Vol. V, page 350
"Biography of Francis C. Osborn," The Book of Detroiters 2nd edition, Albert N. Marquis, ed., Chicago, A.N. Marquis & Co., 1914 (via Wayne County, MI Biographies website)

Obituaries, The News-Palladium, 26 May 1927

Notes

American inventors
NCR Corporation people
Businesspeople from Detroit
People from Bridgeport, New York
1856 births
1926 deaths